Song Jong-Shik (Hangul: 송 종식, born ) is a South Korean male weightlifter, competing in the 85 kg category and representing South Korea at international competitions. He participated at the 2004 Summer Olympics in the 85 kg event. He competed at world championships, most recently at the 2003 World Weightlifting Championships.

Major results

References

External links
 

1976 births
Living people
South Korean male weightlifters
Weightlifters at the 2004 Summer Olympics
Olympic weightlifters of South Korea
Place of birth missing (living people)
Weightlifters at the 2002 Asian Games
Medalists at the 2002 Asian Games
Asian Games medalists in weightlifting
Asian Games gold medalists for South Korea
20th-century South Korean people
21st-century South Korean people